Eduardo Martín Toval (5 March 1942 – 15 January 2019) was a Spanish lawyer and politician who served as a Deputy between 1977 and 1980, and again between 1982 and 1995 and as a member of the Catalan Parliament between 1980 and 1982.

Early life 
Bachelor and Doctor of Law, during his youth he was linked to progressive Christian circles in Malaga. He joined the Labor Inspectorate and in 1967 he moved to Barcelona as Labor Inspector. Already in Barcelona, he was a professor of Labor Law at the Autonomous University of Barcelona. He also participated in the founding of the Center for Labor Studies and Advice, a university center for job counseling for workers.

He participated very actively in the preparation of the Spanish Constitution and, above all, the Statute of  Autonomy of Catalonia, forming part of the "Commission of the Twenty". Between 1985 and 1993 was the spokesperson of the socialist group in the Congress of Deputies. In 1995 he resigned his seat to run for mayor of his hometown, Málaga, without getting past the third place (the triumph corresponded to the PP candidate, Celia Villalobos)

He died on 15 January 2019 after participating in a feminist demonstration in his hometown.

References

1942 births
2019 deaths
People from Málaga
20th-century Spanish lawyers
Politicians from Andalusia
Socialists' Party of Catalonia politicians
Spanish Socialist Workers' Party politicians
Members of the constituent Congress of Deputies (Spain)
Members of the 1st Congress of Deputies (Spain)
Members of the 2nd Congress of Deputies (Spain)
Members of the 3rd Congress of Deputies (Spain)
Members of the 4th Congress of Deputies (Spain)
Members of the 5th Congress of Deputies (Spain)
Members of the Parliament of Catalonia
Academic staff of the Autonomous University of Barcelona